The Association of Saône and Madon Country communes (French: Communauté de communes du Pays de Saône et Madon) is a former administrative association of rural communes in the Vosges département of eastern France and in the region of Lorraine. It was created in 1992 and had its administrative offices at Darney. It was merged into the new Communauté de communes les Vosges côté Sud-Ouest in January 2017. It takes its name from the rivers Saône and Madon.

Composition 
The Communauté de communes comprised the following communes:

Attigny
Belmont-lès-Darney
Belrupt
Bonvillet
Darney
Dombasle-devant-Darney
Dommartin-lès-Vallois
Escles
Esley
Frénois
Hennezel
Jésonville
Lerrain
Pont-lès-Bonfays
Provenchères-lès-Darney
Relanges
Saint-Baslemont
Sans-Vallois
Senonges
Thuillières
Les Vallois
Vioménil

References

Saone and Madon Country